Vimaladharmasurya II (ruled 1687–1707) was a king of Kandy who succeeded his father, Rajasinghe II. He allowed Joseph Vaz to settle in his kingdom and allowed him to preach the Christian faith.

Childhood
During his childhood Lord Ambanwela Rala, who was a member of the royal court from a noble Kandyan family led a rebellion against Rajasinghe II. Rebels tried to use Crown Prince Vimaladharmasuriya against his father. But his paternal half-aunt Sama Devi, who held the position of "Mother Queen" at that time was rescued him from rebels and taken to the king. Rajasinghe II hide him to save from the rebels. So Vimaladharmasuriya was brought up by a bhikku for a long period in his childhood.

King Vimaladharmasurya II was naturally of peaceful temperament. During his childhood though, a sufficient number of Buddhist priests were not able to conduct the higher ordination (Upasampadā) ceremony.

Marriages
Following his father's tradition, he also brought brides from Madurai Nayak royal clan. Not only his Queen Consort but also he had several Royal Concubines from Nayakkar clan. But none of those consorts were able to produce an heir to the throne.

So he married a princess from a local noble family who lived in the Muthukude Walawwa at Wattegama. This Royal Concubine was called as Muthukude Devi. She could able to give birth to a son, who later became king's successor Vira Narendra Sinha

And also according to historical sources he had a concubine from Kirawelle royal clan, who was the mother of king's another son Pattiya Bandara.

Contributions to Buddhism in Sri Lanka
He invited 33 priests from Burma and established the higher ordination that helped protect Buddhism.

The Dutch
During the reign of King Vimaladharmasurya II, many attempts made by the Dutch to capture the Kandyan Kingdom had failed. However the Dutch gained control of the Kandyan Kingdom's foreign trade.

Relations with Daud Khan Panni
In the year 1703, the Mughal commander at Coromandel, Daud Khan Panni spent 10,500 coins to purchase 30 to 50 War elephants from Ceylon. These purchases were acknowledged by Vimaladharmasurya II of Kandy.

See also
 Mahavamsa
 List of monarchs of Sri Lanka
 History of Sri Lanka

References

Sources
 Kings & Rulers of Sri Lanka

V
 Sinhalese Buddhist monarchs
1707 deaths
Monarchs of Kandy
Year of birth unknown
V
V
V